Tatakan is a rural locality (a railway station) in Otvazhnensky Selsoviet of Arkharinsky District, Amur Oblast, Russia. The population was 85 as of 2018. There is 1 street.

Geography 
Tatakan is located near the left bank of the Arkhara River, 11 km southeast of Arkhara (the district's administrative centre) by road. Otvazhnoye is the nearest rural locality.

References 

Rural localities in Arkharinsky District